Tanaïs ( Tanwi Nandini Islam) is an American fiction writer and perfumer. They are the founder of the Brooklyn-based beauty and fragrance company TANAÏS. They are of Bangladeshi descent.

Born in Illinois, they spent their childhood in various cities such as Houston, Columbia, and St. Louis, before settling in Brooklyn. They received a BA in women's studies with a focus on performance art and Asian American studies at Vassar College and a MFA in creative writing at Brooklyn College.

Career

Tanaïs first worked in New York City as a community organizer at Make the Road New York, a non-profit organization based in Bushwick, Brooklyn to empower working class communities. Later in 2006 in New Delhi, India through the William J. Clinton Fellowship for Service, they started writing their first draft of their debut novel Bright Lines. The novel was named finalist for the Center for Fiction First Novel Prize, the Brooklyn Eagles Literary Prize, and the Edmund White Award for debut fiction.

While writing Bright Lines, Tanaïs grew interested in olfaction and started their own botanically-based perfume and candle line Hi Wildflower Botanica.

Tanaïs's 2022 memoir, In Sensorium, won the Kirkus Prize for nonfiction.

Works

Books
 2015: Bright Lines, Penguin Books, 
 2022: In Sensorium: Notes For My People, Harper Books,

References

American people of Bangladeshi descent
American writers of Bangladeshi descent
21st-century American novelists
American women company founders
American cosmetics businesspeople
Vassar College alumni
Brooklyn College alumni
Living people
1982 births
21st-century American women writers